Salon-la-Tour is a commune in the Corrèze department in central France.

Violette Szabo, a 22-year-old British agent who was parachuted a second time into France, on 7 June 1944 (where she was to try to help obstructing the movement of German SS units from the south of France to Normandy), was captured near Salon-la-Tour.

Population

Notable residents
 Varg Vikernes

See also
Communes of the Corrèze department

References

Communes of Corrèze
Corrèze communes articles needing translation from French Wikipedia